The Silent Angel (German: Der schweigende Engel) is a 1954 West German drama film directed by Harald Reinl and starring Josefin Kipper, Robert Freitag and Christine Kaufmann.  It was shot at the Wiesbaden Studios in Hesse and on location in Kastel and Eltville and Kaub in the Rhine Valley. The film's sets were designed by the art director Heinrich Beisenherz.

Cast
 Josefin Kipper as Sylva Verena
 Robert Freitag as Robert 
 Christine Kaufmann as 	Angelika Helmer
 Gustav Waldau as Kolka
 Alice Treff as 	Miss Küfner
 Albert Florath as 	Pfarrer
 Gaby Reismüller	as 	Frau Kohlsack
 Rolf Wanka as 	Kats
 Ingeborg Schöner as 	Elfie
 Siegfried Breuer Jr. as 	Andreas 
 Werner Stock as 		Löffel
 Karin Dor as Erika
 Harry Hardt as Intendant
 Oscar Sabo as Onkel Franz
 Michael Gebühr as Rudi
 Maria Marietta as 	Charlott
 Leila Negra as 	Singer

References

Bibliography
 Bock, Hans-Michael & Bergfelder, Tim. The Concise CineGraph. Encyclopedia of German Cinema. Berghahn Books, 2009.
 Fenner, Angelica. Race Under Reconstruction in German Cinema: Robert Stemmle's Toxi. University of Toronto Press,  2011.
 Lisanti, Tom & Paul, Louis Film Fatales: Women in Espionage Films and Television, 1962-1973. McFarland, 2002

External links 
 

1954 films
1954 drama films
German drama films
West German films
1950s German-language films
Films directed by Harald Reinl
1950s German films
Constantin Film films

de:Der schweigende Engel